Grand Exit is a 1935 American detective mystery film with comedy elements, directed for Columbia Pictures by Erle C. Kenton, with screenplay by Bruce Manning and Lionel Houser, based on a story by Gene Towne and Graham Baker. The leads, in their second film together, are Edmund Lowe and Ann Sothern, with supporting players Onslow Stevens, Robert Middlemass and Wyrley Birch.

Plot

Mysterious woman at suspicious fire
The front page of a brochure depicts a globe with ribbons stating "INTEROCEANIC FIRE INSURANCE CO." and, underneath, "estd. 1872" and, still below, "OFFICES IN ALL PRINCIPAL CITIES". Turning to page 6., one sees a photograph of a building described above as "EXCELSIOR PAPER COMPANY" and below as "Insured by Interoceanic Fire Insurance Co." As a blazing inferno collapses the building in the photo, a policeman moves away the onlookers and one of them (Edmund Lowe) takes a few steps aside to find a woman (Ann Sothern), standing on a pile of crates, observing the fire. As he looks up at her, she says, "I wonder how it started". He responds by providing a bantering discourse on "two hundred and two ways of starting a fire", illustrating it by striking a match on his teeth. He then offers her a cigarette, then invites her for a beer ("nice cold beer is very nice after a hot fire"), then "some food" and, finally, "a little stroll through the park". She refuses all offers ("you seem to think I was born yesterday"), gets into a car and drives away, while the building collapses and a hand is seen putting an "X" across its photo on the ledger page.

The board of directors faces a crisis
At a meeting of Interoceanic board of directors, the chairman (unbilled Russell Hicks) announces to the eight other members, "six big fires in as many weeks representing a total loss to this company of one million, eight hundred and seventy-two thousand, nine hundred and sixty-one dollars", while apple-chewing member Digby (unbilled Raymond Brown) adds, from the back of the room, "and ninety-four cents". The chairman turns to an investigator in the room, Mr. Grayson (Onslow Stevens) and demands results. Grayson explains that the fires appear to be the work of an arsonist ("one of our advertising booklets was mailed back to us anonymously") who draws an "X" across each business which he or she sets ablaze. The next is indicated as "ACME FUR COMPANY" and the cut-out letters "WHEN?". One of the board members (unbilled Edward Van Sloan) exclaims, "Arson! Arson! Every time you investigators get up a tree, you cry firebug". To which the apple-chewing Digby responds, "Better get Tom Fletcher back, boys". As the members discuss details, Grayson describes it as "the biggest campaign of crime ever aimed at a fire insurance company" and Digby chimes in, "well, that's some kind of a record — better get Tom Fletcher back, boys — he's the best insurance investigator in the country". Another member (unbilled John Ince) seconds it, "Digby's right — Fletcher's record in arson cases is unbeatable". The general manager, Mr. French (unbilled Sam Flint) objects, "and so are some of his other records...", but is overruled.

Fletcher deals with the board of directors and meets his new secretary
Fletcher, the man in the opening scene, is at a bar, sharing drinks with three young women. When one reaches for a drink, he objects, "ah, ah, ah, teacher spank — you know my rules — sobriety test before every drink". The first one, Marie (unbilled Patricia Farley) fails "she sells seashells by the she sore". The next one, Nancy (unbilled Geneva Mitchell) also fails with "peter potter picked a peck of peckled pippers", as Grayson approaches to propose business. Fletcher tells him "I'm in conference" and gives a chance to the third girl, Sally (unbilled Dorothy Dehn), to prove her sobriety. She succeeds with "six sleek and supple salmon slept on a platter for supper". Grayson tells him that Interoceanic wants him back, but Fletcher replies that they can "go jump in a lake" adding that "they gave me a raw deal". Grayson convinces him by saying that the board is ready to "eat the well known humble pie". At that point, the two girls who failed start reciting their tongue twisters over each other. Fletcher leaves, giving the tab to Grayson, at company expense.

Arriving at the meeting, Fletcher sits in the director's chair and demands an office with a well-stocked refrigerator, a secretary ("not too young, not too old"), a car and a chauffeur ("any kind of a car will do, as long as it's a Rolls-Royce"), a doubling of his old salary, plus a bonus of a hundred thousand dollars for catching the pyromaniac. After he leaves, the board member portrayed by Edward Van Sloan says, "a plain case of blackmail. I wouldn't want to be quoted, but I bet he started those fires just to get his job back."

As Grayson, having been replaced by Fletcher, starts to pack, Fletcher calls Mr. French to tell him that he wants Grayson as a co-investigator. As French voices his objections, Fletcher hangs up. A showgirl-type secretary (unbilled Iris Adrian) enters and announces that "Mr. French said I was to do your secretarial work". "Good old French", replies Fletcher, dictating a letter and sending Grayson to dismiss all the security people working on the endangered businesses, so that he can replace them with his own trusted people.

Fletcher meets the same woman and another secretary
Acme Fur Company, as expected, goes up in flames. On their way there, Fletcher and Grayson pass a car and Fletcher orders his driver to "cut across that car". Inside is the same woman Fletcher met at the Excelsior fire. She explains that she was not running away from the fire, but simply going to get a better look. Getting into Fletcher and Grayson's car, she rides with them to the fire. Upon arriving, Fletcher leaves to investigate, while the woman introduces herself to Grayson as Adrienne Martin. Fletcher asks his man Tony, the organ grinder with a monkey (unbilled Monte Carter) who walks over to identify the man seen leaving the building. Questioned by Fletcher, the man identifies himself as Mr. Crane (unbilled Barlowe Borland), the owner. Meanwhile, upon being repeatedly asked by Adrienne about Fletcher, Grayson tells her that "when the honorable Tommy passes into the great beyond, half the girls in town will be out shopping for mourning outfits".

Returning, Fletcher takes Grayson and Adrienne for drinks to his fancy apartment replete with Japanese valet Noah (Miki Morita). She tells him that "the young lady's twenty-four, she's lived in France for the past five years and she's on orphan with no mother to guide her". When they toss a coin to decide who would take her home, she peeks at the coin and chooses Fletcher. She and Fletcher go to a bar and have a conversation about arson. He tells her, "oh, you can't find out anything about a fire while it's blazing. It's like a love affair." She says, "you mean you never really understand it while it's flaming?" and he replies, "it just happens… and later on…" She continues, "when it dies down…" and he finishes, "you find the reason for it… in the ashes."

Searching for clues in the smoldering ruins of Acme Fur, Fletcher runs into an old adversary, fire chief Mulligan (Robert Middlemass) and sees Adrienne who tells him that she wants to be a fireman. He puts a fireman's hat on her head and administers a mock swearing-in oath. He shows her a burned-up phone which, he tells her, he collects at every fire. He brings it to his office and runs into his new blonde secretary (unbilled Carol Tevis), with an opposite personality to the previous showgirl type. "What happened to the old one", he asks. "Oh, she got transferred to another apartment", the new one explains and, in the course of their conversation, tells Fletcher that she does not like strawberries. "Do they give you a rash?", he inquires. "Mister Fletcher", she replies, "after all, you ain't my doctor".

Fletcher searches for clues and meets his third secretary
At the board meeting, in front of the disbelieving fire chief, he starts an explosive fire to demonstrate that the blazes were started by a man posing as a telephone repairman who rigged a chemical device attached to a company phone which was ready to burst into flame at the sound of a ring. Later, Grayson and Adrienne are sitting in a restaurant as he recounts Fletcher's demonstration and Adrienne complements his cleverness. She then goes to pay a representative (unbilled Ralph McCullough) for a newspaper's personal column, to place an ad with the words, "F. – Please don't use phone any more. – A". At night, a shadowy figure is subsequently seen opening a building's skylight, pouring liquid down, and resealing the opening.

The next morning Fletcher tells Noah that a young lady is coming for breakfast and Noah is unable to tell him that she's already arrived, "oh, tried to very hard, sir, but you talk too fast". Fletcher and Adrienne have a bantering conversation about wedding bells, because, as he puts it, "it's high time". Just then, ringing is heard and she says, "there go your wedding bells now". The ticker tape machine prints out news of a fire and Fletcher's driver takes him and Adrienne to the scene. Approaching one of his contacts, apple seller Molly (unbilled Daisy Belmore), he inquires as to details. Cockney-accented Molly tells him that the previous day, "an odd duck" in a long overcoat came and went. Sifting through the smoldering wreckage, Fletcher uncovers a curious piece of glass which, a specialist (unbilled Edward Earle) tells him, was the "thinnest magnifying lens ever made". Its inventor, Fred Maxwell and his wife, "a very fine chemist" ran the Maxwell Glass Company until it went out of business.

Returning to his office, he examines the glass and is confronted by another new secretary, Miss Appleby (unbilled Nora Cecil), a severe middle-aged type with a disapproving outlook, who tells him that "Mister French is planning to give you a new secretary every three or four days". When asked about opening a bottle of wine, she tells him, "I disapprove of the use of stimulants in any manner…", with Fletcher completing in unison with her, "shape or form" and then tells her to take a letter to French, "Esteemed sir, in the future, please don't reach so far down into the bottom of the barrel". When Miss Appleby asks, "will that be all?", he replies, "I'm optimistic enough to hope that it will be all".

Fletcher explains to the board how the new fire was started by a magnifying glass in the skylight and mentions Maxwell, with the board recollecting that they put Maxwell out of business by refusing his request for a loan. When Fletcher mentions to Grayson that someone must have warned the arsonist causing him to change his method, Grayson admits that he mentioned it to Adrienne. Fletcher tells him, "John, when your mouth's closed, you can't put your foot in it, remember that."

Adrienne comes under suspicion
Charles the bellboy (unbilled Mickey Bennett) brings Adrienne the paper which has the personal ad, "A -- The story continues on page nine. -- F." She looks at the brochure of insured businesses at "9." to see "METROPOLITAN LEATHER COMPANY". As fire engines race to a false alarm, a one-legged watchman (unbilled Earle D. Bunn), one of Fletcher's men, tells him that he'll be on the lookout. As Fletcher comes out, another of his men, a blind pencil seller, tells him that the alarm was turned in by a woman and "I got her license number". "Are you sure it was a woman?", asks Fletcher. "D'ya think I'm blind?", replies the blind man. Going to Adrienne's garage, Fletcher compares her license plate and confirms it to have the same number. He goes to her apartment and, after some bantering conversation, asks if she used her car. When she says no, he reminds her about their date tonight and goes home.

As Fletcher is dressing for the dinner date, Grayson arrives with results of his investigation which indicate that Maxwell had a million dollar life insurance policy with Interoceanic, but the company refused to pay his daughter Adeline after Maxwell jumped off the dock seven years ago, because, Fletcher interjects, there was no "corpus delicti". On a moment's decision, he gives Grayson two tickets to The Music Box for the date with Adrienne and asks him to "tell her I'm busy — something sudden". "Are you drunk?", asks Grayson. "Not yet", replies Fletcher.

As Grayson picks up Adrienne at her hotel to go to the theater, Fletcher watches them and then tricks the porter (unbilled Joseph De Stefani) into opening the door to Adrienne's room. Searching her suitcase, he finds a passport with her photograph under the name "Adeline Maxwell", father's name "Fred J. Maxwell", mother's name "Frances Maxwell". As he finds further proof in a copy of the originally-seen Interoceanic brochure and secret communication with her father through personal ads, fire engine alarms are heard from the street. As Fletcher arrives on the scene, Sam the one-legged watchman is being carried out on a stretcher and can barely manage to say "hello, boss" to him. A hand is seen drawing an "X" across the brochure's photo of "Metropolitan Leather Company".

Fletcher has Adrienne arrested
Fletcher returns home and tells Noah to bring a drink, "no, I changed my mind, several drinks". When Adrienne and John arrive at Fletcher's apartment, he is drunk and pleads with her to tell him the truth. When she is unable, he opens the bedroom door to reveal that district attorney Cope (Selmer Jackson) and Police Chief Roberts (Guy Usher) are waiting to arrest her. Grayson defends her, but Fletcher tells him that the pyromaniac is Maxwell's widow, Frances, who has decided to avenge her husband by setting the fires. The next day, however, Grayson comes in and tells Fletcher that Mrs. Maxwell "died eight months ago — she's dead — she died before the first fire was ever started — she was buried in France where they lived". He then tells Fletcher "you framed that girl" and continues, "you'd crucify your best friend to solve a case". As Grayson walks out, Fletcher calls Travis Detective Agency "to shadow John Grayson".

Adrienne's father is revealed as the pyromaniac
The following morning, Fletcher goes to Cope's office and tells him that he framed Adrienne and that she "knows nothing about it". Cope refuses and replies that "everybody knows you're stuck on this girl", but she's being held in the psychopathic ward until the trial. Fletcher has an expert (unbilled George McKay) show him the psycho ward layout, then goes out wearing an incongruous outfit and says to Officer Mulcahy (unbilled Dell Henderson), "Can you tell me where I can find a policeman?" and continues, "A woman without an umbrella… across the street… there she was… Fifth Avenue… streetcar… John pulled a gun… and shot the baby… no ambulance around when he arrived…" and when Mulcahy asks, "What do you mean?", continues, "Why, you dumb flatfoot, woman without an umbrella… Johnson Troy shooting fast… forty-fifth street… cooled off fast… pulled out a gun, hit the pillow, shot the baby, no ambulance around when the elephant got there…", then punches Mulcahy, causing himself to be committed into the man's psycho ward which adjoins the women's ward where Adrienne is held under the watchful eye of a matron (unbilled Betty Farrington). Intending to free her, Adrienne's father (unbilled Harold Howard) also has himself committed under the name "John Harmon" and, during yard exercise period, starts a fire in the ward's paint shop. As the blaze rages, Fletcher chases him to the roof where Maxwell slips and falls to his death. Blackened with soot, Fletcher is treated for burns on his arms, as DA Cope and Chief Roberts explain that Maxwell confessed before dying. Grayson also arrives and everyone offers explanatory details.

Some time later, in Fletcher's apartment, Adrienne, accompanied by Grayson, asks Fletcher where "you're going on this extended vacation". Fletcher says "Rome" to confirm that it was Nero "who set fire to Rome — so I'm going to poke around in the ashes". He wishes John and Adrienne well and makes his "grand exit". As the elevator door closes, Adrienne says, "down please" and it opens again. She tells him that she is going to Rome because "I have a theory of my own". He asks, "Do you think you'll find it… in the ashes?" and she answers, "I think I will".

The players

Edmund Lowe as Tom Fletcher 
Ann Sothern as Adrienne Martin
Onslow Stevens as John Grayson
Robert Middlemass as Fire Chief Mulligan
Wyrley Birch as Warden
Selmer Jackson as District Attorney Cope
Guy Usher as Police Chief Roberts
Miki Morita as Noah

Casting notes
This was the second of two features which paired 45-year-old veteran leading man Edmund Lowe, whose film career dates back to 1915, with 26-year-old newcomer Ann Sothern.Let's Fall in Love, their initial film, also at Columbia Pictures, was released nearly two years earlier, in December 1933, and was the leading lady's first co-starring role as well as the first film featuring her new stage name "Ann Sothern".

Tagline
"HE'S BURNING UP… and so is the town!when a blonde baby out of nowhere starts going to blazes with him!"

Grand Exit on Turner Classic Movies
Grand Exit was shown March 4, 2015 on Turner Classic Movies as part of its "Star of the Month salute" to Ann Sothern.

Introductory comments
"Hi, I'm Robert Osborne. Thanks so much for joining us. This week we begin our star of the month festival for March — a thirty-six-film salute to one of the most underrated actresses of the Golden Age of Hollywood, the delightful Ann Sothern. Over the course of her sixty-year career, Ann Sothern found success on the stage, on radio, on film and, certainly, on television, becoming one of those faces which would, invariably, make an audience, en masse, kind of give it a happy sigh of relief, knowing well, now we're in good hands, I know I'm gonna have a good time. And with Ann Sothern, they always did. Still, I don't think the film industry ever really fully appreciated her abilities and rarely gave her a chance to stretch as an actress, something Ann lamented about later in her life. Early on, she spent time working all over Hollywood — at Warner Brothers, RKO, Twentieth Century Fox and things got particularly promising for her when she signed with the mighty MGM in 1939. But that didn't really pan out much either. She was so charming in whatever she was given to do, MGM put her in one film after another and never really upping the stakes by teaming with any of the big male stars on the MGM contract list, people like Tracy or Gable, Bob Taylor, Walter Pidgeon. But all that was still in the future when she made our next film, as a contract player at colo... Columbia Studios.

Our film is called Grand Exit — it was done in nineteen thirty-five and teams Ann with Edmund Lowe. Now Edmund Lowe, in this movie, plays a ladies man who makes a living as an arson investigator. It's while investigating a whole string of arson fires, that he crosses paths with Ann Sothern who somehow always seems to be around when a building goes up in flames. It's all very lively and fast-paced — a movie that clocks in at just a little over an hour long. So have a look... from nineteen thirty-five, here's our star of the month, Ann Sothern doing what she always did so well — making an average script look very entertaining to watch. From nineteen thirty-five, here's Grand Exit."

Robert Osborne's closing comments
"When this film was in development in nineteen thirty-four, there was trouble with it and the Hollywood Production Code. Columbia Pictures submitted the script to the Code office for review and was rejected for filming because of fears that the film would actually teach people how to set arson fires. So the studio went to experts for some help — an insurance company and the LA Fire Department. Both reviewed the script and wrote letters to the Production Code office, challenging that decision — and the Code backed down… for once, which, in those days, it didn't often do. Up next, another breezy film from early in the film career of Ann Sothern. It's one of the many movies she made in which she was teamed with actor Gene Raymond."

References

External links 
 
 
 
 
 

1935 films
American black-and-white films
Columbia Pictures films
Films directed by Erle C. Kenton
1935 mystery films
American mystery films
1930s English-language films
1930s American films